Anastasia Aleksandrovna Konkina (born 1 December 1993) is a Russian judoka.

She participated at the 2018 World Judo Championships, winning a medal.

References

External links
 

1993 births
Living people
Russian female judoka
Sportspeople from Samara, Russia
Universiade bronze medalists for Russia
Universiade medalists in judo
European Games gold medalists for Russia
Judoka at the 2019 European Games
European Games medalists in judo
21st-century Russian women